The Courage Cornwall League 1 1987–88 was the first full season of rugby union within the ninth tier of the English league system, currently known as Tribute Cornwall League 1. Illogan Park finished the league season unbeaten, and as the first champions were promoted to the Courage Cornwall/Devon League for season 1988–89. Stithians lost all ten matches, finishing in last place and were relegated to Courage Cornwall League 2, along with St Just who finished one place above them.

Participating teams and locations
The 1987–88 Courage Cornwall League 1 consists of eleven teams. Each team played one match against each of the other teams, playing a total of ten matches with five at home and five away. The season started on 12 September 1987 and ended on 19 March 1988.

League table

See also
 Rugby union in Cornwall
 English rugby union system

References

External links
 Trelawny's Army

Cornwall2
Cornwall League 1